Martin Welzel (born November 11, 1972 in Vechta, West Germany) is a German organist, musicologist, and pedagogue.

Biography 
Martin Welzel received his first musical training in Bremen, where Käte van Tricht (a former student of Karl Straube) was one of his teachers. Between 1993 and 2001, he studied organ with Daniel Roth and Wolfgang Rübsam, piano with Kristin Merscher, and harpsichord with Gerald Hambitzer at the Hochschule für Musik Saar in Saarbrücken. Later, he studied organ and harpsichord with Carole Terry at the University of Washington in Seattle and graduated with a Doctor of Musical Arts degree in 2005. During his graduate studies, he was the recipient of an Ambassadorial Scholarship from the Rotary Foundation. In 2006–2007, he was acting professor of organ at the Hochschule für Musik in Saarbrücken and lecturer of piano accompaniment at Ludwig-Maximilians-Universität in Munich. He was associate organist at Munich Cathedral from 2021–2022. As a concert performer, he has played throughout Europe, in Russia, South Africa, and the United States, and has recorded organ works by Max Reger at Trier Cathedral for Naxos.

Discography 
 Max Reger: Organ Works, Vol. 6. Chorale Fantasia on "Alle Menschen müssen sterben" op. 52, no. 1; Six Trios op. 47; Variations and fugue on an original theme op. 73. Naxos Records (2005).
 Max Reger: Organ Works, Vol. 8. Chorale Fantasia on "Ein feste Burg ist unser Gott" op. 27; Excerpts from Twelve Pieces op. 80; Excerpts from 30 Chorale Preludes op. 135a; Prelude and fugue in F-sharp minor (1912); Romance in A minor (1904); Introduction and Passacaglia in D minor (1899). Naxos Records (2008).
 Max Reger: Organ Works, Vol. 10. Prelude and fugue in E minor op. 85, no. 4; Excerpts from 52 Chorale Preludes op. 67; Prelude and fugue in G-sharp minor (1906); Chorale Fantasia on "Freu dich sehr, o meine Seele" op. 30. Naxos Records (2010).

Bibliography 
 Welzel, M. (2005) Jeanne Demessieux (1921–1968): a critical examination of her life (Publication No. 3178169) (DMA Dissertation, University of Washington). ProQuest Dissertations & Theses Global.
 Welzel, M. (2009) Petr Eben. Das Orgelwerk. Musik und Ästhetik 13(50), 109–112.
 Welzel, M. (2014) Organist an Notre-Dame de Paris. Eine Erinnerung an Pierre Cochereau (1924–84) – zum 90. Geburtstag und 30. Todestag. Organ – Journal für die Orgel 17(4), 42–45.

See also
 List of organists

References

External links 
 Official Website of Martin Welzel
 Martin Welzel (Naxos Records)

1972 births
Living people
People from Vechta
German classical organists
German male organists
21st-century organists
21st-century male musicians
German musicologists
German music educators
Hochschule für Musik Saar alumni
University of Washington alumni
University of Washington School of Music alumni
20th-century German male musicians
Male classical organists